Mom Rajawongse Adulakit Kitiyakara (: November 2, 1930 – May 5, 2004), was the chief-president of the supreme judicature of Thailand, and former member of the Privy Council of Thailand. He was a member of the House of Kitiyakara, the Princely House descended from the Chakri dynasty. He was the elder brother of Queen Sirikit, consort of King Bhumibol Adulyadej (Rama IX) of Thailand.

Biography
Mom Rajawongse Adulakit was born on November 2, 1930, at Deves Palace. He was the second son of Prince (Mom Chao) Nakkhatra Mangkala (later the Prince of Chantaburi II, son of Prince Kitiyakara Voralaksana, Prince of Chantaburi) and Mom Luang Bua Sanidvongs. His name was given by King Prajadhipok (Rama VII) of Siam. His name means The great honorary.

He had three siblings: one elder brother and two younger sisters:
 Prof. Dr. Mom Rajawongse Kalyanakit Kitiyakara (born September 20, 1929, died May 15, 1987)
 Mom Rajawongse Sirikit Kitiyakara (later Queen Sirikit of Thailand) (born August 12, 1932)
 Mom Rajawongse Busba Kitiyakara (born August 2, 1934)

When he was 2, his father was created Charge d' affaires of Washington, D.C., after the 1932 Siamese Revolution. And Mom Luang Bua, his consort followed his husband to the United States after gave birth to the first daughter, Mom Rajawongse Sirikit. The couple moved to the United States with their first son Mom Rajawongse Kalyanakit Kitiyakara. He lived with his grandmother Princess (Mom Chao) Apsornsaman Kitiyakara and his aunt Mom Chao Chitbanchong Kitiyakara.

Education and work
Mom Rajawongse Adulakit graduated from  Saint Gabriel's College, Bangkok. After his father was appointed Ambassador to the Court of St. James's, (i.e. Ambassador to the United Kingdom), he studied Engineering in Portsmouth Technical College. After having graduated from college, he continued to study law at the Inn of Court (Middle Temple), the famous law school in England.

When he moved back to Thailand, he continued studying at The Institute of Legal Education of The Thai Bar. After graduation, he worked as a judge in Ministry of Justice. Moreover, he worked as a teacher in the faculty of law, Thammasat University. In 1966, King Bhumibol Adulyadej created him a judge of Chiang Mai Court. He and his family moved to Chiang Mai for 3 years. Later in 1974, he studied at the National Defence College of Thailand. After graduation, he was created President of Children and Family Court until he retired. He has been a member of the Privy Council since then.

Marriage

While he was in England, he met his cousin Princess (Mom Chao) Bandhu Savali Yugala (daughter of Prince Bhanubandhu Yugala and Mom Luang Soiraya Sanidvongse) Their relatives was from Mom Rajawongse Suvabandhu Sanidvongse, Princess Bandhu Savali's grandfather was the elder brother of Mom Rajawongse Sadan Sanidvongse, Adulakit's grandfather. They began engaged in February 1956. And then came back to Thailand. The marriage was performed by King Bhumibol Adulyadej and Queen Sirikit, Adulakit's younger sister at Klai Kangwon Palace.

The couple have 2 daughters:

 Mom Luang Soamsawali Kitiyakara, (born July 13, 1957) later Princess Soamsawali of Thailand, married Crown Prince Maha Vajiralongkorn, has 1 daughter, then divorced in 1991.
 Mom Luang Sarali Kitiyakara, (born April 8, 1966) married Thiradej Chirathiwat, has 2 sons.

Mom Rajawongse Adulyakit Kitiyakara died on May 5, 2004 at Bangkok Hospital, at the age of 74.

Royal Decorations
  Knight Grand Cross (First Class) of The Most Illustrious Order of Chula Chom Klao
  Knight Grand Cordon (Special Class) of The Most Exalted Order of the White Elephant
  Knight Grand Cordon (Special Class) of The Most Noble Order of the Crown of Thailand
  King Rama IX Royal Cypher Medal (Second Class)
  Chakrabarti Mala Medal (Medal for Long Service and Good Conduct [Civil])

Ancestry

References

Sources
 Ancestor of the Royal Houses from the Chakri Dynasty

1930 births
2004 deaths
Adulakit Kitiyakara
Adulakit Kitiyakara
Adulakit Kitiyakara